The Commonwealth War Graves Commission (CWGC) aims to commemorate the UK and Commonwealth dead of the World Wars, either by maintaining a war grave in a cemetery, or where there is no known grave, by listing the dead on a memorial to the missing. This is a listing of those memorials maintained solely or jointly by the CWGC that commemorate by name the British and Commonwealth dead from the Western Front during World War I whose bodies were not recovered, or whose remains could not be identified. In addition to those listed here, there are numerous CWGC memorials to the missing from other battlefields around the world during the war, which are not listed here, most notably the memorials at Gallipoli, and the memorials to those lost at sea and in the air. There are also memorials to the missing from other combatant nations on the Western Front, especially those of Germany and France, but only the CWGC-maintained memorials are listed here.

Although listing the names of dead soldiers on memorials had started with the Boer Wars, this practice was only systematically adopted after World War I, with the establishment of the Imperial War Graves Commission, which was later renamed the Commonwealth War Graves Commission. Due to the rapid movement of forces in the early stages of the war, many of the casualties of the initial World War I battles had no known grave, and were instead commemorated after the war on 'memorials to the missing'. In later battles, the intensity of the fighting sometimes meant that bodies could not be recovered or identified until much later. The highest number of casualties occurred on the Western Front in France and Belgium. In total, over 20 separate CWGC or national memorials to the missing of the Western Front were designed and built. They were commissioned and unveiled over a period of around 15 years from the early 1920s to 1938, when the last of the planned memorials was unveiled. The numbers listed on the memorials reduces over time as remains are discovered, identified, and buried in a war grave, with the name removed from the memorial where it was listed, but over 300,000 war dead are still commemorated by these memorials to the missing.

List of memorials

The total number of names inscribed on the memorials listed here, according to the CWGC figures given above, is 314,176.

National memorials
Some memorials were organised by nation, rather than by battlefield. United Kingdom and South African forces are named on the memorials designated for the areas where they fell. The South African national memorial at Delville Wood has no names inscribed on it, as the names are listed on the battlefield memorials instead. The other Commonwealth nations have national memorials dedicated to their missing who fell on the Western Front: the Neuve-Chapelle Memorial to the forces of India; the Vimy Memorial to the forces of Canada and the Beaumont-Hamel Memorial to the forces of Newfoundland; the Villers-Brettonneux Memorial to the forces of Australia; and the Messines Ridge Memorial to the forces of New Zealand (the latter is one of seven memorials on the Western Front dedicated to New Zealanders). The missing war dead of Ireland, at the time of the war still part of the United Kingdom, are numbered among the UK forces (as were English, Scottish and Welsh troops) and listed with them on the memorials. The main memorials to the Irish war dead, one in France and one in Belgium, are the Ulster Tower and the Island of Ireland Peace Park, unveiled in 1921 and 1998 respectively.
 Delville Wood Memorial (South Africa)
 Vimy Memorial (Canada)
 Villers-Bretonneux Memorial (Australia)
 Neuve-Chapelle Memorial (India)
 Beaumont-Hamel Memorial (Newfoundland)
 Messines Ridge Memorial (New Zealand)

See also
 List of Commonwealth War Graves Commission World War II memorials to the missing
 Canadian First World War Memorials In Europe (template listing)

References

External links

 World War I memorials to the missing (www.britishwargraves.co.uk)
 World War I memorials to the missing (www.worldwar1.nl)
 World War I memorials to the missing (www.malvernremembers.org.uk)
 World War I memorials to the missing (www.remembering.org.uk)
 Animation of Commonwealth war casualties during World War I (www.geo-animate.com)

Commonwealth War Graves
Commonwealth War Graves
Commonwealth War Graves
Commonwealth War Graves
Commonwealth War Graves